The 2012 World Short Track Speed Skating Championships took place between March 9 and 11, 2012 at the Shanghai Oriental Sports Center in Shanghai, China. The World Championships are organised by the ISU which also runs world cups and championships in speed skating and figure skating.

Schedule

Results
* First place is awarded 34 points, second is awarded 21 points, third is awarded 13 points, fourth is awarded 8 points, fifth is awarded 5 points, sixth is awarded 3 points, seventh is awarded 2 points, and eighth is awarded 1 point in each race, to determine to Overall World Champion. Points are only awarded to the athletes that have taken part in the Final of each race. The leader after the first 1000m in the 3000m Super-Final is awarded extra 5 points. Relays do not count for the Overall Classification.

Men

* Skaters who did not participate in the final, but received medals.

Ladies

* Skaters who did not participate in the final, but received medals.

Medal table

References

External links
 
 ISU Results
 Results book

 
World Short Track Speed Skating Championships
International speed skating competitions hosted by China
World Short Track Speed Skating Championships
World Short Track Championships
Sports competitions in Shanghai
2010s in Shanghai